K-spanner may refer to:
Graph spanner
Tree spanner
Geometric spanner

See also
Spanner (disambiguation)